Here Comes Success is the fifth and final studio album by Band of Susans, released on February 28, 1995, by Blast First and Restless Records.

Andrew Earles included the album in his book Gimme Indie Rock: 500 Essential Underground Rock Albums 1981–1996 alongside The Word and the Flesh.

Cover and images
Band leader Robert Poss is a Rambler automobile fan with a particular interest in Rambler Marlins. An official American Motors Corporation (AMC) factory publicity photograph of the 1965 Marlin is the cover art for the Here Comes Success album and the car's hood ornament is the art on the CD itself.

Track listing

Personnel 
Adapted from Here Comes Success liner notes.

 Anne Husick – electric guitar
 Mark Lonergan – electric guitar
 Robert Poss – electric guitar, vocals, production
 Ron Spitzer – drums
 Susan Stenger – bass guitar, vocals

Production

 Bryce Goggin – engineering
 Royston Langdon – assistant engineer

Release history

References

External links 
 

1995 albums
Band of Susans albums
Blast First albums
Restless Records albums
Albums produced by Robert Poss